Iophon is a genus of sponges belonging to the family Acarnidae. The genus has a cosmopolitan distribution.

Description 
This geus contains species with non-fistulose, massive, branching or encrusting growth forms. The ectosomal (outer) skeleton is made of tylotes (long, slender megascleres with knobs at both ends) with microspined bases. The choanosomal (inner) skeleton is a rounded, triangular or square-meshed network of smooth or spined choanosomal styles, arranged singly or with 2-3 per row. The microscleres include bipocilla and palmate anisochelae with spurs. Bipocilla are unique to this genus. They are modified anisochela in which the wing-like alae are joined together by a short curved shaft. Toxas are absent.

Species
The following species are recognised:

Iophon abnormalis (Ridley & Dendy, 1886)
Iophon aceratum (Hentschel, 1914)
Iophon bipocillum (Aguilar-Camacho, Carballo & Cruz-Barraza, 2013)
Iophon cheliferum (Ridley & Dendy, 1886)
Iophon chilense (Desqueyroux-Faúndez & van Soest, 1996)
Iophon cylindricum (Ridley & Dendy, 1886)
Iophon dogieli (Koltun, 1955)
Iophon dubium (Hansen, 1885)
Iophon flabellodigitatum (Kirkpatrick, 1907)
Iophon frigidum Lundbeck, 1905
Iophon funis (Topsent, 1892)
Iophon gaussi (Hentschel, 1914)
Iophon hesperidesi (Rios, Cristobo & Urgorri, 2004)
Iophon husvikense (Goodwin, Brewin & Brickle, 2012)
Iophon hyndmani (Bowerbank, 1858)
Iophon indentatus (Wilson, 1904)
Iophon koltuni Morozov, Sabirov & Zimina, 2019
Iophon laevistylus Dendy, 1924
Iophon lamella (Wilson, 1904)
Iophon laminale (Ridley & Dendy, 1886)
Iophon methanophila (Cárdenas, 2019)
Iophon minor (Brøndsted, 1924)
Iophon nigricans (Bowerbank, 1858)
Iophon omnivorus (Ridley & Dendy, 1887)
Iophon ostiamagna (Wilson, 1904)
Iophon parvachela (Esteves, de Paula, Lerner, Lôbo-Hajdu & Hajdu, 2018)
Iophon piceum (Vosmaer, 1882)
Iophon pictoni (Goodwin, Brewin & Brickle, 2011)
Iophon pluricorne (Topsent, 1907)
Iophon pommeraniae (Thiele, 1903)
Iophon proximum (Ridley,1881)
Iophon radiatum (Topsent, 1901)
Iophon rayae (Bakus, 1966)
Iophon roseum (Goodwin, Brewin & Brickle, 2016)
Iophon semispinosum (Bergquist, 1961)
Iophon spinulentum (Bowerbank, 1866)
Iophon terranovae (Calcinai & Pansini, 2000)
Iophon timidum (Desqueyroux-Faúndez & van Soest, 1996)
Iophon tubiforme (Desqueyroux-Faúndez & van Soest, 1996)
Iophon unicorne (Topsent, 1907)
Iophon variopocillatum (Alander, 1942)

References

Poecilosclerida
Sponge genera